The Shelter of Your Arms is a 1964 album by Sammy Davis Jr. The title track reached No. 3 on the R&B singles, No. 7 on the Easy Listening chart, and No. 17 on the Billboard Hot 100 pop chart.

Track listing
 "Bee-Bom" (Les Vandyke) – 2:22
 "Make Someone Happy" (Betty Comden, Adolph Green, Jule Styne) – 3:00
 "The Party's Over" (Comden, Green, Styne) – 4:17
 "Some Days Everything Goes Wrong" (Ervin Drake) – 2:50
 "The Shelter of Your Arms" (Jerry Samuels) – 2:52
 "A Man With a Dream" (Stella Unger, Victor Young) – 2:57
 "That's for Me" (Oscar Hammerstein II, Richard Rodgers) – 3:11
 "If I Loved You" (Hammerstein, Rodgers) – 3:58
 "Come On Strong" (Sammy Cahn, Jimmy Van Heusen) – 2:37
 "I Married an Angel" (Lorenz Hart, Rodgers) – 2:00
 "Guys and Dolls" (Frank Loesser) – 2:09

References

1964 albums
Sammy Davis Jr. albums
Reprise Records albums